Dennis Evans (born 23 July 1935) is an English footballer, who played as a full back in the Football League for Wrexham and Tranmere Rovers.

References

External links

Tranmere Rovers F.C. players
Wrexham A.F.C. players
Bangor City F.C. players
Association football fullbacks
English Football League players
Living people
1935 births
English footballers